9U  or 9-U may refer to:

9U, IATA code for Air Moldova
One of the possible sizes of a rack unit
Yak-9U, a model of Yakovlev Yak-9
Su-9U, a designation of Sukhoi Su-9
9U, a type of  Volkswagen Caddy
9U, Aircraft registration code for Burundi
HP 9U, a Windows 3.0 version of the Windows-1252 codepage by Hewlett-Packard printers

See also
U9 (disambiguation)